Gwen Wall (born 16 January 1963) is a Canadian retired athlete who competed in the 400 metres hurdles. She represented her country at two World Championships. In addition she won a bronze medal at the 1983 Pan American Games.

Her personal best in the event is 56.68 seconds set in Helsinki in 1983.

International competitions

1Representing the Americas

References

1958 births
Living people
Canadian female hurdlers
Athletes (track and field) at the 1982 Commonwealth Games
Athletes (track and field) at the 1986 Commonwealth Games
Athletes (track and field) at the 1983 Pan American Games
Athletes (track and field) at the 1987 Pan American Games
Pan American Games bronze medalists for Canada
Pan American Games medalists in athletics (track and field)
World Athletics Championships athletes for Canada
Medalists at the 1983 Pan American Games
Commonwealth Games competitors for Canada
Universiade bronze medalists in athletics (track and field)
Universiade bronze medalists for Canada